In music, Op. 75 stands for Opus number 75. Compositions that are assigned this number include:

 Bruch – Serenade
 Dvořák – Romantic Pieces
 Elgar – Carillon
 Fauré – Andante for violin and piano
 Saint-Saëns – Violin Sonata No. 1
 Schumann – Romanzen & Balladen volume II (5 partsongs)
 Strauss – Die ägyptische Helena
 Toch – Symphony No. 3
 Weber – Bassoon Concerto